This is a list of 145 species in Rhagonycha, a genus of soldier beetles in the family Cantharidae.

Rhagonycha species

 Rhagonycha addenda  Dahlgren, 1972
 Rhagonycha aetolica (Kiesenwetter, 1852) g
 Rhagonycha alaskensis Fender, 1972 i g
 Rhagonycha aliena Dahlgren, 1972 g
 Rhagonycha andalusica Dahlgren, 1975 g
 Rhagonycha angulata (Say, 1823) i g b
 Rhagonycha angulatocollis Costa, 1858 g
 Rhagonycha antennata (Green, 1941) i g
 Rhagonycha anthracina Mannerheim, 1853 i g
 Rhagonycha approximana (Fairmaire, 1884) g
 Rhagonycha atra (Linnaeus, 1767) g
 Rhagonycha balcanica Pic, 1901 g
 Rhagonycha bohaci Svihla, 1990 g
 Rhagonycha campestris (Green, 1941) i g b
 Rhagonycha carpathica Ganglbauer, 1896 g
 Rhagonycha cartwrighti (Green, 1941) i g b
 Rhagonycha caspica Wittmer, 1972 g
 Rhagonycha chevrolati Marseul, 1864 g
 Rhagonycha chlorotica (Gené, 1839) g
 Rhagonycha cloughi (Miskimen, 1956) i g
 Rhagonycha coloradensis (Green, 1941) i g b
 Rhagonycha complicans Dahlgren, 1979 g
 Rhagonycha confusa Dahlgren, 1975 g
 Rhagonycha corcyrea Pic, 1901 g
 Rhagonycha costipennis (LeConte, 1884) i g
 Rhagonycha cruentata (Reiche, 1862) g
 Rhagonycha cruralis (LeConte, 1851) i g b
 Rhagonycha decorata Pic, 1912 g
 Rhagonycha degener (Blatchley, 1928) i g
 Rhagonycha delagrangei Pic, 1898 g
 Rhagonycha dichroa LeConte, 1851 g b
 Rhagonycha diversipes  Pic, 1905
 Rhagonycha divisa Dahlgren, 1972 g
 Rhagonycha drienensis Dahlgren, 1978 g
 Rhagonycha elbursiaca Wittmer, 1972 g
 Rhagonycha elongata (Fallén, 1807) g
 Rhagonycha esfandiarii Wittmer, 1972 g
 Rhagonycha excavata (LeConte, 1851) i g b
 Rhagonycha falcifera Dahlgren, 1972 g
 Rhagonycha femoralis (Brulle, 1832) g
 Rhagonycha fenderi (Miskimen, 1956) i g
 Rhagonycha fraxini (Say, 1823) i g b
 Rhagonycha fugax Mannerheim, 1843 g
 Rhagonycha fulva (Scopoli, 1763) i g b  (common red soldier beetle)
 Rhagonycha fulvaliena Svihla, 1995 g
 Rhagonycha fuscitibia Rey, 1891 g
 Rhagonycha galiciana  Gougelet, 1859
 Rhagonycha gallica Pic, 1923 g
 Rhagonycha genistae Kiesenwetter, 1865 g
 Rhagonycha ghilanensis Dahlgren, 1985 g
 Rhagonycha gilvipennis (Rosenhauer, 1856) g
 Rhagonycha gilvipes (Gemminger, 1870) i g
 Rhagonycha greeni (Fall, 1936) i g b
 Rhagonycha helleni Dahlgren, 1968 g
 Rhagonycha herbea Marseul, 1864 g
 Rhagonycha hesperica Baudi, 1859 g
 Rhagonycha heterodoxa (Green, 1941) i g b
 Rhagonycha hirticula (Green, 1941) i g b
 Rhagonycha hispanica Pic, 1932 g
 Rhagonycha hyrcana Svihla, 2002 g
 Rhagonycha iberica Dahlgren, 1975 g
 Rhagonycha imbecillis (LeConte, 1851) i g b
 Rhagonycha impar (LeConte, 1881) i g
 Rhagonycha interposita Dahlgren, 1978 g
 Rhagonycha iranica Wittmer, 1972 g
 Rhagonycha karsensis Svihla, 1995 g
 Rhagonycha kefallinica Dahlgren, 1975 g
 Rhagonycha kiesenwetteri (Marseul, 1864) g
 Rhagonycha kubanensis Pic, 1900 g
 Rhagonycha kuleghana (Marseul, 1868) g
 Rhagonycha kurdistana Svihla, 1983 g
 Rhagonycha lencoranica Kazantsev, 1992 g
 Rhagonycha lignosa (Müller, 1764) g
 Rhagonycha limbata Thomson, 1864 g
 Rhagonycha lineola (Fabricius, 1792) i g b
 Rhagonycha longula (LeConte, 1851) i g b
 Rhagonycha luristana Svihla, 1995 g
 Rhagonycha lutea (Müller, 1764) g
 Rhagonycha luteicollis (Germar, 1824) i g b
 Rhagonycha macedonica Dahlgren, 1985 g
 Rhagonycha machulkai Svihla, 1993 g
 Rhagonycha maculicollis Märkel, 1852 g
 Rhagonycha mandibularis (Kirby in Richards, 1837) i g b
 Rhagonycha martini Pic, 1908 g
 Rhagonycha meridionalis Dahlgren, 1975 g
 Rhagonycha micheli Okushima & Yang, 2013 g
 Rhagonycha milleri Kiesenwetter, 1860 g
 Rhagonycha mimetica (Green, 1941) i g
 Rhagonycha mollis (Fall, 1936) i b
 Rhagonycha morio Kiesenwetter, 1852 g
 Rhagonycha morvani Wittmer, 1974 g
 Rhagonycha nanula (LeConte, 1881) i g b
 Rhagonycha neglecta Dahlgren, 1975 g
 Rhagonycha nevadensis Svihla, 1995 g
 Rhagonycha nigriceps (Waltl, 1838) g
 Rhagonycha nigricollis Motschulsky, 1849 g
 Rhagonycha nigripes Redtenbacher, 1842 g
 Rhagonycha nigritarsis Brulle, 1832 g
 Rhagonycha nigriventris Motschulsky, 1860 g
 Rhagonycha nigrohumeralis (Green, 1941) i g b
 Rhagonycha nigrosuta Fiori, 1899 g
 Rhagonycha nitida Baudi, 1859 g
 Rhagonycha notaticollis Rosenhauer, 1856 g
 Rhagonycha opaca Mulsant, 1862 g
 Rhagonycha oriflava (LeConte, 1874) i g b
 Rhagonycha ornaticollis Marseul, 1864 g
 Rhagonycha parvicollis (Green, 1941) i g b
 Rhagonycha patricia Kiesenwetter, 1865 g
 Rhagonycha pedemontana Baudi di Selve, 1872 g
 Rhagonycha persica Pic, 1933 g
 Rhagonycha picticornis (Green, 1941) i g
 Rhagonycha plagiella Marseul, 1864 g
 Rhagonycha proxima (Green, 1941) i g b
 Rhagonycha quadricollis Kiesenwetter, 1852 g
 Rhagonycha querceti Kiesenwetter, 1865 g
 Rhagonycha rambouseki Svihla, 1993 g
 Rhagonycha recta (Melsheimer, 1846) i g b
 Rhagonycha richteri Wittmer, 1972 g
 Rhagonycha rorida Kiesenwetter, 1867 g
 Rhagonycha rufithorax (Pic, 1906) i g
 Rhagonycha sareptana Marseul, 1868 g
 Rhagonycha scitula (Say, 1825) i g b
 Rhagonycha seiberti (Miskimen, 1956) i g
 Rhagonycha septentrionis (Green, 1941) i g
 Rhagonycha similata Dahlgren, 1976 g
 Rhagonycha straminea Kiesenwetter, 1859 g
 Rhagonycha striatofrons Dahlgren, 1972 g
 Rhagonycha sylvatica (Green, 1941) i g b
 Rhagonycha taiwanonigra Wittmer, 1982 g
 Rhagonycha talyschensis Yablokov-Khnzorian, 1959 g
 Rhagonycha tantilla (LeConte, 1881) i g b
 Rhagonycha tenuis (Green, 1941) i g b
 Rhagonycha testacea (Linnaeus, 1758) g
 Rhagonycha translucida (Krynicki, 1832) g
 Rhagonycha triangulifera (Green, 1941) i g b
 Rhagonycha tripunctata (Reiche, 1857) g
 Rhagonycha umbrina (Green, 1941) i g b
 Rhagonycha varians  (Rosenhauer, 1856) 
 Rhagonycha vestigialis (Green, 1941) i g b
 Rhagonycha vicina Baudi, 1871 g
 Rhagonycha viduata (Kuester, 1854) g
 Rhagonycha vilis (LeConte, 1851) i g b
 Rhagonycha vitticollis Menetries, 1832 g
 Rhagonycha walshi (LeConte, 1881) i g b

Data sources: i = ITIS, c = Catalogue of Life, g = GBIF, b = Bugguide.net

References

Rhagonycha